Quaudiophiliac (styled QuAUDIOPHILIAc) is a compilation album featuring music by Frank Zappa, released in DVD-Audio format by Barking Pumpkin Records in 2004. It compiles recordings he made while experimenting with quadraphonic, or four-channel, sound in the 1970s. Zappa prepared quadraphonic mixes of a number of his 1970s albums, with both Over-Nite Sensation (1973) and Apostrophe (') (1974) being released in discrete quadraphonic on Zappa's DiscReet Records label.

Produced by Zappa, and completed by his son, Dweezil Zappa, Quaudiophiliac includes several previously unreleased works in this format. The recordings date from as early as 1970, with "Chunga Basement", a version of the title track from Chunga's Revenge (1970). Also included are three tracks from the 1975 Royce Hall, UCLA concerts with the Abnuceals Emuukha Electric Orchestra which would become Orchestral Favorites (1979); plus a quad remix of a segment of Zappa's 1968 musique concrète masterpiece Lumpy Gravy.

Track listing

Personnel

Musicians
 Frank Zappa – guitar, vocals, arranger, conductor
 Napoleon Murphy Brock – vocals
 Adrian Belew – guitar
 George Duke – keyboards
 Andre Lewis – keyboards
 Ian Underwood – keyboards
 Tommy Mars – keyboards, vocals
 Don Preston - Minimoog
 Max Bennett – bass guitar
 Alex Dmochowski – bass guitar
 Roy Estrada – bass guitar
 Tom Fowler – bass guitar
 Patrick O'Hearn – bass guitar
 Terry Bozzio – drums, vocals
 Aynsley Dunbar – drums
 Chester Thompson – drums
 Ed Mann – percussion
 Mike Altschul – bass clarinet, bass flute, piccolo, bass saxophone, tenor saxophone
 Sal Marquez – trumpet, flugelhorn
 Billy Byers – trombone, baritone horn
 Kenny Shroyer – trombone, baritone horn

Production 
 Frank Zappa – producer, engineer, mixing
 Dweezil Zappa – producer, engineer
 Jeff Skillen – executive producer
 Gail Zappa – executive producer, art direction, photography
 Art Kelm – technical support
 Richard Landers – technical support
 Fred Maher – technical support, artist relations
 Stephen Marcussen – mastering
 Jeff Levison – production supervisor
 Jaime Ramírez – production coordination
 Joe Travers – vault research
 John "Buddy" Williams – photography, cover photo
 Keith Lawler – package layout, design, photography

References

External links
Lyrics and details
Quaudiophiliac at zappa.com

2004 compilation albums
Barking Pumpkin Records albums
Compilation albums published posthumously
Frank Zappa compilation albums
Quadraphonic sound